Tanjung Gemuk (literally translated as the "Fat Cape") is a small coastal village near Port Dickson in the Malaysian state of Negeri Sembilan. Its beach is part of Port Dickson's long coastline fronting the Strait of Malacca.

There is a holiday resort, Glory Beach Resort, built approximately 5 years ago in Tanjung Gemuk. It is not a luxurious resort but an economic accommodation option which attracts many tourists from all over the country and even from countries around Malaysia because of its low price, good service and fairly good facilities. Recently, many water chalets have been built in Tanjung Gemuk. One of them is Grand Lexis (formerly known as The Legend International Water Homes), which not only provide water chalets but normal rooms with good facilities. Tanjung Gemuk is still a fairly big residential area despite the hotel and the resort. There are also some coffee shops and grocery shops where residents and tourists always visit.

Turtles have been sighted laying eggs on its beach recently. Locals have seen baby turtles reaching out from the sand heading towards the water.  This is a new phenomenon in Tanjung Gemuk.  After the 2004 Indian Ocean earthquake and tsunami in Indonesia, sea cucumbers were washed up the beach in Tanjung Gemuk; thousands were seen but most of them were dead. Surprised locals combed the beach for the sea cucumbers because they are considered a delicacy.

Populated places in Negeri Sembilan